"Shady Lady" is a song recorded by Ukrainian singer Ani Lorak. It is best known as the  entry at the Eurovision Song Contest 2008, held in Belgrade. It was composed by Philipp Kirkorov and written by Karen Kavaleryan. However, around the time of the contest there were many rumors in Greece stating that popular composer Dimitris Kontopoulos had actually composed the song. Although his name was not credited during the Eurovision Song Contest performances, it was later confirmed that Kontopoulos was indeed a producer of the song.

Eurovision
The song competed in the second semi-final on 22 May, performing 4th in the running order, preceding 's Mor ve Ötesi with "Deli" and preceding 's Jeronimas Milius with "Nomads in the Night". It received 152 points, placing 1st in a field of 19 and qualifying for the final.

In the final she performed her song 18th, the third year in a row that a Ukrainian entry had performed in this position, following 's Diana Gurtskaya with "Peace Will Come" and preceding 's Sébastien Tellier with "Divine". A Russian-language version of the song exists, titled "" ("From Sky to Sky").

The single itself has become very successful in Ukraine featuring two A-sides: "Shady Lady" and "Ja Stanu Morem" ("I'll Be a Sea"), which was also a Eurovision candidate. The single also featured the video of "Shady Lady" as a bonus track, while the other three Eurovision candidates were also included. It charted for over 30 weeks, peaking at number 1 on the official Ukrainian charts, while also faring well in neighbouring countries.

Track listing 
Ukrainian edition

 "Shady Lady" (Philipp Kirkorov, Karen Kavaleryan)
 "The Dream of Brighter Day" (Ani Lorak, Juri Sak)
 "I'll Be Your Melody" ("Bozheny Kostroma")
 "Ždu tebja" ("Waiting for You")
 "Ja Stanu Morem" ("I'll Be a Sea")
Bonus track:
 "Shady Lady" (video)

Charts

Weekly charts

Year-end charts

References

Eurovision songs of Ukraine
Eurovision songs of 2008
Songs with lyrics by Karen Kavaleryan
English-language Ukrainian songs
Virgin Records singles
2008 songs
Songs written by Dimitris Kontopoulos
Songs written by Philipp Kirkorov
Eurodisco songs